This is a list of electoral divisions and wards in the ceremonial county of Tyne and Wear in North East England. All changes since the re-organisation of local government following the passing of the Local Government Act 1972 are shown. The number of councillors elected for each electoral division or ward is shown in brackets.

District councils

Gateshead
Wards from 1 April 1974 (first election 10 May 1973) to 6 May 1982:

Wards from 6 May 1982 to 10 June 2004:

Wards from 10 June 2004 to present:

Newcastle upon Tyne
Wards from 1 April 1974 (first election 10 May 1973) to 6 May 1982:

Wards from 6 May 1982 to 10 June 2004:

Wards from 10 June 2004 to 3 June 2018:

Wards from 3 May 2018 to present:

North Tyneside
Wards from 1 April 1974 (first election 10 May 1973) to 6 May 1982:

Wards from 6 May 1982 to 10 June 2004:

Wards from 10 June 2004 to present:

South Tyneside
Wards from 1 April 1974 (first election 10 May 1973) to 6 May 1982:

Wards from 6 May 1982 to 10 June 2004:

Wards from 10 June 2004 to present:

Sunderland
Wards from 1 April 1974 (first election 10 May 1973) to 6 May 1982:

Wards from 6 May 1982 to 10 June 2004:

Wards from 10 June 2004 to present:

Former county council

Tyne and Wear
Electoral Divisions from 1 April 1974 (first election 12 April 1973) to 1 April 1986 (county abolished):

Electoral wards by constituency

Blaydon
Birtley, Blaydon, Chopwell and Rowlands Gill, Crawcrook and Greenside, Dunston Hill and Whickham East, Lamesley, Ryton, Crookhill and Stella, Whickham North, Whickham South and Sunniside, Winlaton and High Spen.

Gateshead
Bridges, Chowdene, Deckham, Dunston and Teams, Felling, High Fell, Lobley Hill and Bensham, Low Fell, Saltwell, Windy Nook and Whitehills.

Houghton and Sunderland South
Copt Hill, Doxford, Hetton, Houghton, St Chad's, Sandhill, Shiney Row, Silksworth.

Jarrow
Bede, Boldon Colliery, Cleadon and East Boldon, Fellgate and Hedworth, Hebburn North, Hebburn South, Monkton, Pelaw and Heworth, Primrose, Wardley and Leam Lane.

Newcastle upon Tyne Central
Benwell and Scotswood, Blakelaw, Elswick, Fenham, Kenton, Westgate, West Gosforth, Wingrove.

Newcastle upon Tyne East
Byker, Dene, North Heaton, North Jesmond, Ouseburn, South Heaton, South Jesmond, Walker, Walkergate.

Newcastle upon Tyne North
Castle, Denton, East Gosforth, Fawdon, Lemington, Newburn, Parklands, Westerhope, Woolsington.

North Tyneside
Battle Hill, Benton, Camperdown, Howdon, Killingworth, Longbenton, Northumberland, Riverside, Wallsend, Weetslade.

South Shields
Beacon and Bents, Biddick and All Saints, Cleadon Park, Harton, Horsley Hill, Simonside and Rekendyke, Westoe, West Park, Whitburn and Marsden, Whiteleas.

Sunderland Central
Barnes, Fulwell, Hendon, Millfield, Pallion, Ryhope, St Michael's, St Peter's, Southwick.

Tynemouth
Chirton, Collingwood, Cullercoats, Monkseaton North, Monkseaton South, Preston, St Mary's, Tynemouth, Valley, Whitley Bay.

Washington and Sunderland West
Castle, Redhill, St Anne's, Washington Central, Washington East, Washington North, Washington South, Washington West.

See also
List of parliamentary constituencies in Tyne and Wear

References
http://www.opsi.gov.uk/si/si2007/uksi_20071681_en_1

Tyne And Wear
Politics of Tyne and Wear
Electoral wards